Grant Michael Lambert (born 5 August 1977, Sydney, Australia) is an Australian cricketer. He plays first-class cricket for NSW and grade cricket for Fairfield-Liverpool. He is a right-arm fast-medium bowler and a right-hand bat. His best bowling effort was 4/80 against Tasmania in 2005/06. He has twice won the Bill O'Reilly Medal as the best player in the Sydney Grade competition.

He was educated at Patrician Brothers' College Blacktown and has contributed to the coaching of the school's elite cricket program with coaches Chris Ferry and Dom Cullen.

Sydney Grade Cricket record 
On 24 February 2007 Lambert broke a 63-year-old record for the most runs in a Sydney Grade Cricket season. Playing for Fairfield-Liverpool against Northern Districts at Rosedale Oval, Lambert scored 94 to take his season total to 1458 runs. This moved him 45 runs ahead of Bill Alley's record of 1413 runs set in the 1943/44 season. Lambert reached the mark in 20 innings, which included six centuries and five 50s, at an average of 104.14. Alley required 24 innings at 70.65 to set the previous record. In this same game the Fairfield-Liverpool side broke a 20 year ground record for the highest team total of 5 dec for 447, in which Northern Districts chased down the runs only to fall at 304 all out.

References

External links
Cricinfo Australia profile

Australian cricketers
New South Wales cricketers
Cricketers from Sydney
1977 births
Living people